Maximilian Alexandrovich Saveliev (Russian: Максимилиа́н Алекса́ндрович Саве́льев; February 19, 1884, Nizhny Novgorod – May 15, 1939, Moscow) was a Russian Bolshevik, Soviet academic, economist, journalist and historian.

Life and career 
He was born in to the family of Alexander Aleksandrovich Saveliev, a nobleman and leader of the zemstvo in Nizhny Novgorod who was a deputy of the Imperial State Duma for the Cadet Party. He was named Maximilian after the French revolutionary Maximilien Robespierre.

He studied at the Faculty of Law of the Imperial Moscow University but was expelled from the univerty after three semesters for his revolutionary activities. In 1903 Saveliev joined the Bolshevik faction of the Russian Social Democratic Labour Party. Being very secretive with his revolutionary activities he worked under the pseudonyms Vetrov, Nikita, Valerian and Petrov which resulted in many party members assuming he was more than one person.

In 1903 he was arrested but was soon released. He participated in the 1905 Revolution in Moscow and Saint Petersburg. In 1906 he was once again arrested and released in 1907 and then emigrated to Germany and became a member of the Social Democratic Party of Germany. In 1909 he took courses in economics at the University of Munich however did not graduate. In 1911 he graduated from the Leipzig University with a doctorate of philosophy.

In 1911 Saveliev returned to Russia and became editor of the Bolshevik newspaper "Enlightenment" and became a member of the editorial board of the newspaper Rabochy Put. He was arrested twice during this period but continued his underground political activities. 

From March 1917 he was an agent of the Central Committee of the RSDLP (b) in Kyiv, a member of the Kyiv Committee of the RSDLP (B), and secretary of the Kyiv Soviet of Workers' Deputies. After the October Revolution he became a  member of the editorial board of the newspaper Ekonomicheskaya Zhizn. Saveliev opposed the Brest-Litovsk Treaty and was associated with Left Communists of the Party.

In 1920 he was secretary of the Turkestan Regional Committee of the Russian Communist Party (b). From 1921 to 1922 he was a member of the presidium and head of the editorial and publishing department of the Supreme Soviet of the National Economy and editor of its magazine.  

From 1921 to 1926 he was deputy head of the Istpart of the Central Committee in 1926 he was editor of the journal Proletarian Revolution. From 1927 he was head of the Istpart and after its merger with the Lenin Institute he Saveliev became director of the Lenin Institute.

From July 21, 1929 to July 25, 1930, he was the editor-in-chief of the Izvestia newspaper. During his period of editorship, he ideologically guided the newspaper and wrote many articles in defense of the new repressions against the kulak class, leaders of the opposition in the party Leon Trotsky, Grigoriy Zinoviev, Lev Kamenev and others as well as repressions against religion. In one of the leading articles, Saveliev argued that the Pope and the Bishop of Canterbury, defending the enemies-priests, were calling on the peoples of the world to a "crusade against the USSR." In October 1929, approving the instruction to remove the church bells, Izvestia wrote: "The bell ringing violates the right of the broad atheistic masses of cities and villages to a well-deserved rest."   

In late 1930 he was the chief editor of Pravda. 

From March 1932 he was a member of the Academy of Sciences of the Soviet Union and the Academy of Sciences of the Ukrainian SSR. In 1931 he was deputy, and from 1932 he was appointed Chairman of the Presidium of the Communist Academy under Central Executive Committee of the Soviet Union.

From 1936 to 1938 Saveliev was director of the Institute of Economics of the Academy of Sciences and from 1936 until his death he was deputy director of the Marx-Engels-Lenin Institute.

Maximilian Saveliev died in Moscow in 1939 aged 55 and is buried beside his wife in the Novodevichy Cemetery.

Works 
The main subjects to which his works were devoted are the theory of Marxism–Leninism, the history of the Party and the October Revolution, and the economy of the Soviet Union.

Saveliev's most famous works are "Ленин и Октябрьское вооруженное восстание" (Lenin and the October Armed Uprising) (1927) and "Возникновение большевизма" (The Emergence of Bolshevism) (1933).

References

1884 births
1939 deaths
20th-century Russian journalists
Soviet journalists
Soviet economists
Academicians of the Russian Academy of Sciences and its forerunners
Soviet historians
Russian Marxists
Soviet academics
Soviet newspaper editors
Full Members of the USSR Academy of Sciences
Russian revolutionaries
Old Bolsheviks
Central Committee of the Communist Party of the Soviet Union candidate members
Pravda people
Social Democratic Party of Germany politicians
Leipzig University alumni
Burials at Novodevichy Cemetery
Soviet publishers (people)
Russian Social Democratic Labour Party members